is a railway station in Nagai, Yamagata, Japan, operated by the Yamagata Railway.

Lines
Uzen-Narita Station is a station on the Flower Nagai Line, and is located 21.0 rail kilometers from the terminus of the line at Akayu Station.

Station layout
Uzen-Narita Station has a single side platform serving traffic in both directions. The station is unattended.

Adjacent stations

History
Uzen-Narita Station opened on 11 December 1922. The station was absorbed into the JR East network upon the privatization of JNR on 1 April 1987, and became a station on the Yamagata Railway from 25 October 1988.

Surrounding area
Uzen-Narita Post Office
Mogami River

External links

  Flower Nagai Line 

Railway stations in Yamagata Prefecture
Yamagata Railway Flower Nagai Line
Railway stations in Japan opened in 1922